Yevgeni Nikolayevich Shcherbakov (born 18 February 1986) is a Russian former professional footballer.

Club career
He made his debut in the Russian Premier League for FC Amkar Perm on 17 March 2006 in a game against FC Moscow.

External links
 

1986 births
People from Minusinsk
Living people
Russian footballers
Association football midfielders
FC Dynamo Barnaul players
FC Amkar Perm players
FC Anzhi Makhachkala players
Russian Premier League players
FC Sokol Saratov players
FC Irtysh Omsk players
FC Novokuznetsk players
FC Sakhalin Yuzhno-Sakhalinsk players
FC Chita players
Sportspeople from Krasnoyarsk Krai